D69 may refer to:

Queen's Gambit Declined, Encyclopaedia of Chess Openings code
 D69 (Croatia), a state road in Croatia
 HMAS Vendetta (D69), a destroyer of the Royal Navy and Royal Australian Navy